Andreas H. Bitesnich (born 1964 in Vienna) is an Austrian photographer and musician. He specializes in nude and portrait photography. His work appears regularly in international magazines.

Career
Originally working as a retailer, Bitesnich found his passion for photography when his friend, an assistant photographer, showed him his portfolio of black-and-white photographs. He taught himself the relevant photography techniques. In 1989, he decided to quit his job as a retailer and started working as a professional photographer.

Publications
 Nudes (1998)
 Tension (2000)
 Travel (2001)
 Woman (2001)
 Nudes (2001) 
 Woman (2001) 
 Travel (2001) 
 On Form (2003) 
 Woman (2005)
 Polanude (2005 
 More Nudes (2007)

Award 
2009 Vienna Fashion Awards as Best Photographer

Notes

External links

 "Andreas H. Bitesnich Photography" on a 2004 exhibition at KunstHausWien
photographerslimitededitions Online Gallery

1964 births
Living people
Austrian photographers